Bílkovice is a municipality and village in Benešov District in the Central Bohemian Region of the Czech Republic. It has about 200 inhabitants.

Administrative parts
Villages of Moravsko and Takonín are administrative parts of Bílkovice.

References

Villages in Benešov District